The Swedish Junior Curling Championships is an annual curling tournament held to determine the best junior-level men's and women's curling teams in Sweden. Junior level curlers must be under the age of 21 as of June 30 in the year prior to the tournament. It has been held annually since the 1966-1967 season for junior men and the 1972-1973 season for junior women; the championship events are organized by the Swedish Curling Association.

Champions

Men

Women

References

See also
Swedish Men's Curling Championship
Swedish Women's Curling Championship
Swedish Mixed Curling Championship
Swedish Mixed Doubles Curling Championship
Swedish Senior Curling Championships